Maria Ramos (born 1959) is a South African businesswoman, banker and corporate executive who has been serving the chairperson of AngloGold Ashanti since 2020. She previously served as chief executive officer (CEO) of Absa Group Limited. Prior to joining Absa in March 2009, she was the CEO of Transnet. This was after serving as director-general of the National Treasury.

Early life
Ramos was born in Lisbon, Portugal, on 22 February 1959, the oldest of four daughters. Her parents emigrated to Mozambique and then South Africa in the mid 1960s. Ramos was six when her family began their new life in Vereeniging, south of Johannesburg.

Ramos matriculated in 1977 and went to work for Barclays in Vereeniging as a waste clerk, which involved collecting paperwork such as deposit slips and cheques, from behind the tellers and manually processing them.

Ramos applied for a scholarship under the bank's in-house scheme for employees to complete a university commerce degree, but discovered that it was open to men only. A long battle ensued until she was told that if she sat the basic exams and passed, she would be considered.

Academic life 
An accomplished academic, who has taught at various institutions, Ramos obtained an Institute of Bankers’ Diploma (CAIB) in 1983. She followed this with a Bachelor of Commerce from the University of the Witwatersrand (Wits) in 1986, a Bachelor of Commerce Honours in Economics (also from Wits) in 1987 and a Master of Science (Economics) from the University of London in 1992.

Career
Early in her career, Ramos served as Director-General of the National Treasury from 1996 to 2003.

Ramos was the Chief Executive Officer of Absa Group Limited for ten years, until February 2019. She held  responsibility for executing the Group’s strategy across 10 African operations, serving 15 million customers through more than 11,000 outlets.

Prior to joining Absa as Group Chief Executive in March 2009, she was the Group Chief Executive of Transnet Limited, the state-owned freight transport and logistics service provider for five years.

In addition to her role at Absa, Ramos has in the past served as a non-executive and independent director on the boards of Sanlam Limited, Remgro Limited and SABMiller Plc, and currently serves on the board of Richemont SA.

Other activities
Ramos has in the past served as chairperson of the Banking Association of South Africa. Appointed by United Nations Secretary-General António Guterres, she co-chaired (alongside Achim Steiner) the United Nations' Task Force on Digital Financing of Sustainable Development Goals from 2018 to 2020. In 2021, she was appointed to the World Bank–International Monetary Fund High-Level Advisory Group (HLAG) on Sustainable and Inclusive Recovery and Growth, co-chaired by Mari Pangestu, Ceyla Pazarbasioglu, and Nicholas Stern.

Other roles include:
 Bretton Woods Committee, Member of the Advisory Council (since 2020)
 Blavatnik School of Government, University of Oxford, Member of the International Advisory Board
 World Economic Forum (WEF), Member of the Executive Committee of the International Business Council
 Board of Business Leadership South Africa, Member

Recognition
Ramos is a recipient of honorary doctorates from the Stellenbosch and Free State universities. Ramos led Transnet through a massive financial, cultural and operational turnaround. During her tenure as Director-General of the National Treasury (formerly the Department of Finance), she played a key role in transforming the Treasury into one of the most effective and efficient state departments in the post-apartheid administration.

She has successively been ranked in Fortune magazine’s annual survey of the 50 most powerful women in business for a number of years running, having most recently been ranked 11th in the Europe, Middle East & Africa Region for 2015.

Her contribution has been recognized through numerous awards. She was named CNBC Africa Woman Leader of the Year (2011), and was awarded the Wits Business School’s Management Excellence Award (2010). She was named the Sunday Times Business Times Business Leader of the Year in 2005 and Businesswoman of the Year by the SA Businesswomen’s Association in 2001.

Personal life
Ramos married the South African politician Trevor Manuel in 2008.

References

External links
 Barclays Africa to revert name back to Absa

1959 births
Living people
Barclays people
Alumni of the University of London
White South African people
South African bankers
20th-century South African economists
University of the Witwatersrand alumni
20th-century South African businesswomen
20th-century South African businesspeople
South African chief executives
South African investment bankers
South African women economists
Portuguese emigrants to South Africa
21st-century South African businesswomen
21st-century South African businesspeople
Absa people